Cahagnes is a commune in the Calvados department in the Normandy region in northwestern France.

Population

International relations
Cahagnes is twinned with:
 Horsted Keynes, UK since 1971.
 Mömbris, Germany since 1989 (Mömbris is more precisely twinned with the Pré-Bocage, a grouping of towns of which Cahagne is one).

See also
Keynes Family
Communes of the Calvados department

References

Communes of Calvados (department)
Calvados communes articles needing translation from French Wikipedia